Rev. David Jayne Hill (June 10, 1850 – March 2, 1932) was an American academic, diplomat and author.

Early life
The son of Baptist minister David T. Hill, David Jayne Hill was born in Plainfield, New Jersey, on June 10, 1850.  He graduated from Bucknell University in 1874 and was professor of rhetoric there from 1877 to 1879.  In 1878 he received his Master of Arts degree, and he was a member of the Phi Beta Kappa Society. He also undertook graduate studies at the University of Berlin and the University of Paris.

Career
In 1879, Hill received his ordination and was appointed Bucknell's president.  From 1889 to 1896, he was president of the University of Rochester. In 1888 and 1897 he studied at the Ecole Libre des Sciences Politiques in Paris.

In 1900 he received an honorary Docteur ès lettres from the University of Geneva.  He received an honorary LL.D. from Colgate University in 1884, and he received additional honorary degrees from Union University (1902), and the University of Pennsylvania (1902).

He was later a professor of European diplomacy at the School of Comparative Jurisprudence and Diplomacy.

Diplomatic career
Hill began a diplomatic career when he was appointed Assistant Secretary of State in 1898, serving to 1903.

He was appointed United States Minister to Switzerland in 1903. Two years later he was appointed United States Minister to the Netherlands and Luxembourg.

From 1908 to 1911 he was Ambassador to Germany. He was also a member of the Permanent Administrative Council of The Hague Tribunal.

Hill was an unsuccessful Republican candidate for the United States Senate from New York in 1914.

Later career
During World War I he wrote articles critical of Woodrow Wilson's decision to ask for a declaration of war and the Wilson administration's conduct of the war effort. In July 1920 he was chairman of the Republican State Convention in New York.

In 1922 Hill received France's Grand Officer of the Legion of Honor.

Personal life
In 1874, Hill married Anna Amelia Liddell.  Together they had three sons; Anna died two weeks after giving birth to her third child.

 Walter Hill (1875–1944)
 Arthur Hill (1878–1884)
 David Jayne Hill, Jr. (born and died in 1880).

In 1886, he married Juliet Lewis Packer (1853–1923). They were the parents of twins:

 Catherine Hill (1890–1973)
 David Jayne Hill, Jr. (1890–1975).

Juliet Hill died in Washington, D.C., after being struck by a delivery wagon while crossing the street.  He died in Washington, D.C., on March 2, 1932.

Works

Hill was an author of biography, and also wrote works on religion, psychology, and other topics.  His published works include:

The Life of William Cullen Bryant (1878)
The Science of Rhetoric (1877)
Elements of Rhetoric and Composition (1878)
The Life of Washington Irving (1879)
The Elements of Psychology (1886)
The Social Influence of Christianity (1888)
Principles and Fallacies of Socialism (1888)
Genetic Philosophy (1893)
An Honest Dollar the Basis of Prosperity (1900)
The Conception and Realization of Neutrality (1902)
The Contemporary Development of Diplomacy (1904)
History of Diplomacy in the International Development of Europe, embracing A Struggle for Universal Empire (1905)
The Establishment of Territorial Sovereignty (1906)
World Organization as Affected by the Nature of the Modern State (1911)
The Diplomacy of the Age of Absolutism (1914)
The People's Government (1915)
Americanism: What It Is (1916)
The Rebuilding of Europe (1917)
Impressions of the Kaiser (1918)
Present Problems in Foreign Policy (1919)
American World Policies (1920)

References

External links

 

1850 births
1932 deaths
Politicians from Plainfield, New Jersey
Writers from Washington, D.C.
United States Assistant Secretaries of State
Presidents of Bucknell University
Bucknell University alumni
University of Rochester alumni
New York (state) Republicans
Ambassadors of the United States to the Netherlands
Ambassadors of the United States to Germany
Ambassadors of the United States to Luxembourg
Ambassadors of the United States to Switzerland
Grand Officiers of the Légion d'honneur
Writers from Plainfield, New Jersey
Presidents of the University of Rochester
Historians from New Jersey
20th-century American diplomats